Hong Kong Foundation Day, also known as Hong Kong Day and Festival of Hong Kong, is the anniversary of the founding of Hong Kong as a free port when Britain formally colonised it on 26 January 1841  after entering into a provisional treaty, known as the Chuenpi Convention, with an official of Qing government. The British Colonial Government did not make it an official public holiday, nor does the SAR Government. Yet, some members of the public do organise various history talks or exhibitions on or near 26 January each year.

Hong Kongers, most being native speakers of Cantonese, call this day 開埠日 or hōi fauh yaht, which means “the day of pier opening”, reflecting the original intention of the British acquisition of Hong Kong was for opening it up and turning it into a port of free trade. The name also signifies that international commerce became legally permitted in Hong Kong upon British administration whereas Hong Kong had not been allowed to conduct foreign trade under the Canton System policy of the Qing government.

Background
In January 1841, after a series of negotiations, a provisional treaty seeking to end the First Opium War between Britain and the Qing Dynasty, known as the Convention of Chuenpi, was struck by representatives from the two sides, namely, Plenipotentiary Charles Elliot and Imperial Commissioner Qishan. With the instruction given to him to take possession of some islands for trade in the previous year, Elliot demanded and secured the cession of Hong Kong Island as one of the terms of the Convention even though Zhoushan Island had been more preferred by his boss Lord Palmerston. While in Macau, Elliot announced the details of the Convention by publishing a circular on the 20th.

Four days after the announcement, Captain Edward Belcher, aboard HMS Sulphur, surveyed Hong Kong Island and landed the next morning on the 25th at 8:15 o'clock, but he did not proceed to take formal possession of it. Yet, he did claim themselves being the bona fide first possessors, and they drank to the Queen's health with three cheers.

A formal possession ceremony was held on 26 January by Commodore Gordon Bremer at Possession Point. He was accompanied by other officers of the squadron. The Royal Marines fired a feu de joie, and the war ships performed a Royal Salute. The Union Jack was hoisted, symbolising the beginning of British rule.

Activities 

Today, news media often have history quizzes ready for their audiences on Foundation Day, and non-governmental organisations arrange history talks and exhibitions for the general public to participate.

But celebrations are not limited to Hong Kong. Events have been held in overseas metropolises with significant numbers of diaspora Hong Kongers, such as London and Melbourne. Hong Kong street food stalls, mini-concerts featuring Hong Kong music, and other cultural activities can also be found in these overseas events in addition to history-focused exhibitions and talks.

Human rights groups and pro-democracy activists may also take the opportunity on Foundation Day to raise awareness of various issues about Hong Kong.

50th Anniversary (Golden Jubilee) 

The Hong Kong Post Office released the very first commemorative stamp in Hong Kong's history to celebrate the golden jubilee of the foundation of Hong Kong. And because the government did not have enough time to have a specially designed commemorative stamp ready for the occasion, they instead decided to overprint the existing two-cent definitive stamp with the phrase "1841 Hong Kong JUBILEE 1891". The commemorative overprint became an instant hit. With long queues and only a total of 50,000 prints, collectors got desperate and violent. Many got injured in the ensuing chaos as they tried to get hold of these stamps. In the end, three people died, with a Dutch sailor getting stabbed and two Portuguese customers getting crushed to death.

In addition to the issuance of the golden jubilee stamp, there was a whole range of other celebrations across Hong Kong. Warships in Victoria Harbour fired a royal salute. A troop review was conducted at Happy Valley. The Anglican and Catholic cathedrals conducted special services. Hong Kong City Hall held a public ball. A concert was performed at the Club Germania. Sport games, including cricket and shooting contests, were arranged. Ship owners strung decorative lights on their boats.

100th Anniversary (Centenary) 

1941 saw the centenary of Hong Kong's founding, but celebrations were not as extensive and vibrant as for the Golden Jubilee in 1891 when Europe had already been engulfed in WWII and the prospect of Japan invading Hong Kong was looming on the horizon.

To mark the occasion, the Hong Kong Post Office issued a set of six commemorative stamps. This set of stamps features various local sights and scenes to showcase the developments of Hong Kong as a British colony over the previous 100 years. The stamps were originally intended to be released in October 1940 but ultimately got published on 26 February 1941, exactly one month after the anniversary.

The renowned British sculptor Gilbert Ledward created a bronze statue of King George VI to commemorate the centenary of Hong Kong's foundation. The statue is located in the Hong Kong Zoological and Botanical Gardens.

The Legislative Council also unanimously passed a resolution, titled Loyalty to the Throne, to celebrate the centenary of the foundation of Hong Kong. In particular, Sir Man-kam Lo, a Eurasian lawyer, offered support for the resolution on behalf of all other ethnically Chinese members of the Council.

180th Anniversary 
Year 2021 is the 180th anniversary of Foundation Day. A group of British parliamentarians from the House of Commons, led by Andrew Rosindell MP, tabled the non-binding Early Day Motion 1382 for the occasion in which, among other things, they welcomed those Hong Kongers who were moving to the UK from Hong Kong “to escape the iron heel of Chinese Communist tyranny”.

There was another group of British parliamentarians and activists who partnered with Stand with Hong Kong to create commemorative YouTube videos for the occasion in which they commemorated the 180th anniversary and took the opportunity to express their solidarity with Hong Kongers regarding the democratic and human rights issues they had to endure.

Debate
Quite a few in Hong Kong see Foundation Day as the birthday of Hong Kong, but not everyone agrees.

Though not always, those who regard Foundation Day as Hong Kong’s birthday often attribute the success of modern Hong Kong to the British rule, which began on Foundation Day.

Opponents view 26 January 1841 as a humiliating moment in Chinese history and sometimes label those who think Foundation Day is worthy of celebration as anti-China or even separatists. Similarly, some criticise it as colonial nostalgia.

Notes

References

British Hong Kong
1841 in Hong Kong
History of Hong Kong
Hong Kong–United Kingdom relations